Nora Volkow (born 27 March 1956) is a Mexican-American psychiatrist. She is currently the director of the National Institute on Drug Abuse (NIDA), which is part of the National Institutes of Health (NIH).

Early life and education
Born in Mexico City, Volkow is a daughter of Esteban Volkov, whose mother Zinaida Volkova was the eldest daughter of the Russian communist revolutionary Leon Trotsky. Volkow and her three sisters grew up in Coyoacán in the house where Trotsky was killed (now the Leon Trotsky Museum).

Volkow was educated at the Modern American School, in Mexico City, and graduated M.D. from the National University of Mexico, before her postdoctoral training in Psychiatry at New York University.

In 2014, Volkow participated in an event organized by The Moth at a World Science Festival, where scientists, writers and artists told stories of their personal relationships with science. During this time, she discussed her family history and how it furthered her ambition to pursue science in order to positively influence others.

Career 

During psychiatry residency, she worked on PET scan projects with psychiatrist Jonathan Brodie. After finishing psychiatry residency, she joined the faculty at the University of Texas Medical School at Houston, working on PET scan research projects in addition to clinical duties. She conducted research work with Professor Alan Swann, now at Baylor,  leaving to Brookhaven in 1987.

Volkow spent most of her professional career at the Department of Energy’s Brookhaven National Laboratory (BNL) in Upton, New York, where she held several leadership positions. She was first a researcher at BNL, and then Director of Nuclear Medicine, Director of the NIDA-DOE Regional Neuroimaging Center at BNL, and finally Associate Director for Life Sciences at BNL. She was also appointed as a Professor in the Department of Psychiatry at Stony Brook University and as Associate Dean for its Medical School.

Volkow's imaging studies of the brains of people addicted to drugs have helped to clarify the mechanisms of drug addiction. At Brookhaven, positron emission tomography (PET) scanning was being used to study the brain in people with schizophrenia. When Volkow moved to the University of Texas, studying patients with schizophrenia was not an option, but studying patients with cocaine addiction was possible. Volkow and colleagues studied the distribution of blood flow in the brain of chronic cocaine users and control patients who did use cocaine. They found decreased blood flow to the prefrontal cortex of cocaine users, that continued after ten days of withdrawal from cocaine use. This research has played a part in changing the public's view of drug addiction, from that of a moral violation or character flaw to an understanding that pathological changes to brain structure make it very difficult for addicts to give up their addictions. Volkow concludes that abnormalities in the prefrontal cortex create a feeling of need or craving that people with addictions find difficult to prevent. She argues that this makes it difficult to override compulsions by exercising cognitive control. The main areas affected are the orbitofrontal cortex, which maintains attention to goals, and the anterior cingulate cortex, that mediates the capacity to monitor and select action plans. Both areas receive stimulation from dopamine neurons that originate in the ventral tegmental area. A steady influx of dopamine makes it difficult to shift attention away from the goal of attaining drugs. It also fastens attention to the motivational value of drugs, not pleasure. Volkow suggests that people with addictions are caught in a vicious circle of physical brain changes and the psychological consequences of those changes, leading to further changes.

In 2003 Volkow became director of NIDA.

Volkow is the first person from the NIH to visit the Dalai Lama at his residence in Dharamshala, Himachal Pradesh, India. During this 2013 visit, Volkow took part in a dialogue with the Dalai Lama about addiction science, as part of a five-day conference sponsored by the Mind and Life Institute.

Awards and recognition 

Volkow has been recognized for her contributions, both before and during her time at NIDA. The following are among the most significant: 
Innovator of the Year. U.S. News & World Report, 2000. 
NEWSWEEK: Who's Next 2007, a list of 21 people predicted to be newsmakers in 2007. 
The 2007 TIME 100. TIME's list of the 100 men and women whose power, talent or moral example is transforming the world. 
The List of the Top 100 Most Powerful Women. The Washingtonians list of women who lead and lobby, educate and enlighten, and look for cures and pathways to a better world. 
Washington's 100 Most Powerful Women, Washingtonian Magazine's list of females who've made it to the top. 
Finalist for the Samuel J. Heyman Service to America Medal for the Science and Environment Medal (Sammies), Washington DC 2013. These awards recognize outstanding service and are considered among the most prestigious available to federal workers.
In 2007, NIDA and another NIH Institute (the National Institute on Alcohol Abuse and Alcoholism) received an Emmy Award for HBO's The Addiction Project. Nora Volkow represented NIDA in receiving the Emmy.
 In 2011, Volkow received the Joan and Stanford Alexander Award in Psychiatry, from Baylor College of Medicine’s Menninger Department of Psychiatry and Behavioral Sciences.The prize is awarded to "a mental health professional who has made significant contributions in research, education and clinical or community service for people suffering from severe and persistent mental illness." Volkow's award was in recognition of her work in "demonstrating that drug addiction is a disease of the human brain", and "pioneering the use of brain imaging to investigate the toxic effects of drugs and their addictive properties."
Hispanic Scientist of the Year Award by Museum of Science & Industry (Tampa) in 2012, for promoting scientific understanding in the community and providing a role model for Hispanic youth.
 In 2013, Volkow received the Distinguished Scientist Award from the Child Mind Institute, in recognition of her "outstanding contributions to brain development and psychopathology research." The prize is awarded to "a scientist whose lifelong commitment to research in mental health and developmental neuroscience has led to more effective, evidence-based treatments and a deeper understanding of psychiatric, addictive, and developmental disorders."

Personal life 
Volkow is married to Stephen Adler, a radioimaging physicist at the National Cancer Institute.

Bibliography

References

External links
Nora D. Volkow, M.D., Director's Page, National Institute of Drug Abuse

Why Bad Habits are Hard to Break (CBS 60 Minutes interview, April 2012) -- Text only. Video access requires subscription.
 Hooked: Why Bad Habits are Hard to Break—Freely accessible video at 60 Minutes' YouTube Channel
Nora Volkow: Two Paths to the Future (Vanderbilt University Medical Center Article - February 2006)Nora Volkow - the Time 100, 2007
Zuger, Abigail. "A General in the Drug War". New York Times, June 13, 2011. 
Wingert, Pat. "Nora Volkow."Newsweek, 24 December 2006.
 
Why Is It So Damn Hard to Change? by Rebecca Skloot, O, the Oprah MagazineDr. Nora Volkow Interview, Oral History Program'', Office of NIH History, 6 April 2005.
 

1956 births
20th-century American women scientists
21st-century American women scientists
American addiction physicians
American medical researchers
American neuroscientists
American people of Russian-Jewish descent
American psychiatrists
American women neuroscientists
Brookhaven National Laboratory staff
Hispanic and Latino American scientists
Leon Trotsky
Living people
Mexican emigrants to the United States
Mexican neuroscientists
Mexican people of Russian-Jewish descent
National Autonomous University of Mexico alumni
People from Mexico City
Scientific American people
Women medical researchers
Members of the National Academy of Medicine